The Association of the Luxembourg Fund Industry represents the financial sector of the Luxembourg government.

Membership 

ALFI has three types of membership: full members “(i.e. “fund” members and “non-fund” members)), individual members and associate members.

Eligible investment funds are Undertakings for Collective Investment (UCI) and other regulated investment vehicles. Eligible fund service providers include but are not limited to companies such as custodian banks, fund administrators and managers, transfer agents, distributors, legal firms, consultants, tax offices, auditors and accountants, IT providers and communication companies.

Associate membership is also available to foreign entities provided that they offer services to members.

Chairman of the board

References 

Investment management companies of Luxembourg